Bruce Day may refer to:
 Bruce Day (musician)
 Bruce Day (engineer)